David Stirling (1915–1990) was a British mountaineer and the founder of the Special Air Service.

David Stirling may also refer to:

 David Stirling (footballer) (born 1962), Australian rules footballer
 David Stirling (polo player) (born 1981), Uruguayan polo player 
 David Stirling (architect) (1822–1887), Canadian architect
 M. David Stirling (born 1940), American politician, lawyer and author

See also
 David Sterling (born 1958), Northern Ireland civil servant